A local election  was scheduled to be held in the Mexican state of Nuevo León on Sunday, July 2, 2006. Voters will go to the polls to elect, on the local level:

51 municipal presidents (mayors) to serve for a three-year term.
42 local deputies (26 by the first-past-the-post system and 16 by proportional representation) to serve for a three-year term in the Congress of Nuevo León.

Municipal elections

The following table shows candidates by party to the municipalities within the Monterrey metropolitan area.

External links
Electoral Institute of Nuevo León website

2006 elections in Mexico
Election